Saved by the Belle is a 1939 short subject directed by Charley Chase starring American slapstick comedy team The Three Stooges (Moe Howard, Larry Fine and Curly Howard). It is the 40th entry in the series released by Columbia Pictures starring the comedians, who released 190 shorts for the studio between 1934 and 1959.

Plot
The Stooges are traveling salesmen in the fictional South American country of Valeska, described as a "thriving kingdom in the tropics." The lazy town is only slightly stirred awake by its frequent earthquakes, though there is a quiet revolution on the horizon. The revolutionary leader (Gino Corrado) also happens to run the hotel where the Stooges are staying, and he decides to close the place down. When the trio cannot pay their bill, they are put in jail and are sentenced to be shot as revolutionaries. During their stay, the Stooge befriend Señorita Rita (Carmen Laroux), another member of the revolutionaries, and she helps the Stooges escape. They make their way to the rebels where they are sentenced to be shot for bringing the wrong plans. Saved by an earthquake, the trio escape in a dynamite truck which blows up due to Curly's stupidity. They survive and try to ride out of the country only to fall off the horse they are riding.

Production notes
Saved by the Belle was filmed on December 12–15, 1938. The film title is a play on the boxing expression "saved by the bell." It was the final Three Stooges short to be directed by veteran comedian Charley Chase, who died of a heart attack on June 20, 1940.

When the Stooges introduce themselves to the rebels upon their arrival, Moe is heard saying "Hello, doh!" This line is from the Stooges' "Maharaja" routine, which would be performed in future films Time Out for Rhythm, Three Little Pirates and The Three Stooges Go Around the World in a Daze.

When the Stooges are in front of the firing squad, believing they are to get their picture taken, Curly poses and says to Moe "I'm gonna send one home to Elaine". This is a reference to his then-wife Elaine Ackerman, whom he was married to from 1937 to 1940.

Curly almost laughs and breaks character when the team lands on the horse at the end of the short.

References

External links 
 
 

1939 films
1939 comedy films
1939 short films
The Three Stooges films
American black-and-white films
Films directed by Charley Chase
Films set in a fictional country
Columbia Pictures short films
American slapstick comedy films
1930s English-language films
1930s American films